Peter Kemper (13 October 1942 – 25 March 2020) was a Dutch footballer who played as a defender.

Club career
Born in The Hague, Kemper played for local amateur side Lenig en Snel before joining PSV Eindhoven in 1961. In 14 seasons with PSV, he won two league titles. He played over 200 league and almost 20 European competition matches for the club. Next to his 219 Eredivisie appearances he played 17 matches in the European Cup, the UEFA Cup Winners' Cup and the UEFA Cup. He finished his career with Helmond Sport.

International career
Kemper made his debut for the Netherlands in an October 1964 FIFA World Cup qualification away against Albania and earned a total of 3 caps, scoring no goals. His final international was an April 1967 friendly match against Belgium.

Personal life
After retiring as a player, he worked as a gym teacher at schools and was part of the KNVB disciplinary committee for 33 years. He suffered from a heart attack in 1990 but recovered. He died of heart failure in March 2020.

Honours
Eredivisie: 2
 1963, 1975

References

External links
 
 
 Oud-kampioen Peter Kemper overleden (Bio) - PSV 

1942 births
2020 deaths
Footballers from The Hague
Association football defenders
Dutch footballers
Netherlands international footballers
PSV Eindhoven players
Helmond Sport players
Eredivisie players
Eerste Divisie players